Silene colorata is a species of plant in the family Caryophyllaceae. It is native to Lebanon and surrounding mediterranean areas.

References

Roskov Y., Kunze T., Orrell T., Abucay L., Paglinawan L., Culham A., Bailly N., Kirk P., Bourgoin T., Baillargeon G., Decock W., De Wever A., Didžiulis V. (ed) (2014). Species 2000 & ITIS Catalogue of Life: 2014 Annual Checklist.. Species 2000: Reading, UK.. Retrieved 26 May 2014.
Mouterde, P. (1966). Nouvelle flore du Liban et de la Syrie [New flora of Lebanon and Syria], vol. 1. Beyrouth: Dar El-Machreq.

colorata
Flora of Malta